Four referendums were held in Switzerland during 1921. The first two were held on 30 January on holding referendums on treaties that would be valid for at least 15 years and on abolishing the military judiciary. The treaty proposal was approved, whilst the abolishment of the military judiciary was rejected. The third and fourth were held on 22 May on add articles 37bis and 37ter on road traffic and aviation to the constitution, and on only adding article 37ter on aviation. Both were approved.

Background
The referendums on treaties and the military judiciary were both popular initiatives, whilst the two on amending the constitution were both mandatory referendums. Both types required a double majority; a majority of the popular vote and majority of the cantons. The decision of each canton was based on the vote in that canton. Full cantons counted as one vote, whilst half cantons counted as half.

Results

Referendums on treaties

Abolishment of the military judiciary

Addition of articles 37bis and 37ter to the constitution

Addition of article 37ter to the constitution

References

1921 referendums
1921 in Switzerland
Referendums in Switzerland